Sangri is a town and capital of Sangri County in the Shannan Prefecture in the Tibet Autonomous Region of China. The Yarlung Tsangpo passes near the town. Sangri is located about 99 kilometres from Lhasa.

See also
List of towns and villages in Tibet

External links and references
Wikimapia

Populated places in Shannan, Tibet
Township-level divisions of Tibet